Luis Manuel Pérez Gonzalez (born January 20, 1985) is a Dominican former professional baseball pitcher. He played in Major League Baseball (MLB) for the Toronto Blue Jays and in Nippon Professional Baseball (NPB) for the Tokyo Yakult Swallows.

Career

Toronto Blue Jays

In 2006, his first year at Single A, Pérez went 4–0 with a 1.38 ERA. During his tenure in the minors he had a 12–15 record with a 2.99 ERA in his first 3 seasons (2006–2008).

On April 15, 2011 Pérez got his first call up to the Toronto Blue Jays. On May 28, Pérez recorded his first career win in a 14-inning game against the Chicago White Sox. Corey Patterson hit a solo walk-off home run to give him the win.

After making 29 appearances out of the bullpen for the Blue Jays, Pérez made his first career start against the Oakland Athletics on August 21, 2011. Pérez got the win, pitching 6 innings and giving up just 1 hit and 2 walks. He struck out 4 batters and retired 15 straight batters to open the game.

Pérez recorded the win for the Blue Jays against the Cleveland Indians on Opening Day (April 5, 2012), throwing 4 scoreless innings. The 16 inning game was the longest game in Opening Day history.

After pitching to a 2-2 record with a 3.43 ERA in 35 relief appearances, Pérez was removed from a game against the Chicago White Sox on July 8. After the game it was determined that Pérez had torn his ulnar collateral ligament, and missed the rest of the 2012 season.

On May 7, 2013, it was reported that Pérez was expected to return faster than the usual one-year recovery time associated with Tommy John surgery. Pérez was added to the Dunedin Blue Jays roster for a rehab assignment, and pitched two innings in relief on June 10. His rehab assignment was changed to the Triple-A Buffalo Bisons on August 28. He was activated from the 60-day disabled list by the Blue Jays on September 3 after the Bisons season ended, and the major league rosters expanded. Pérez made his first appearance of the 2013 season on September 4.

Pérez had surgery on his left elbow in January 2014 to remove scar tissue. On March 20, 2014, he was released by the Blue Jays to make room for Matt Tuiasosopo.

Atlanta Braves
Pérez signed a minor league deal with the Atlanta Braves on March 31, 2014. Still recovering from his elbow injuries, he would not throw a single pitch for Atlanta's minor league affiliates, and became a free agent at the end of the 2014 season.

Second Stint with Blue Jays
On February 6, 2015, Pérez signed a minor league contract with the Blue Jays that included an invitation to spring training.

Tokyo Yakult Swallows
After the 2015 season, he was selected to the roster for the Dominican Republic national baseball team at the 2015 WBSC Premier12 and he signed a one-year, $450,000 contract with the Tokyo Yakult Swallows.

Cleveland Indians
Pérez signed a minor league contract with the Cleveland Indians on February 10, 2017. He was released on March 29, 2017.

Sultanes de Monterrey
On January 31, 2018, Pérez signed with the Sultanes de Monterrey of the Mexican League. He was released on April 13, 2018.

References

External links

NPB statistics

1985 births
Living people
Auburn Doubledays players
Buffalo Bisons (minor league) players
Cañeros de Los Mochis players
Dominican Republic expatriate baseball players in Canada
Dominican Republic expatriate baseball players in Japan
Dominican Republic expatriate baseball players in Mexico
Dominican Republic expatriate baseball players in the United States
Dominican Summer League Blue Jays players
Dominican Summer League Braves players
Dunedin Blue Jays players
Lansing Lugnuts players
Las Vegas 51s players
Leones del Escogido players
Major League Baseball pitchers
Mexican League baseball pitchers
New Hampshire Fisher Cats players
Nippon Professional Baseball pitchers
Sultanes de Monterrey players
Tokyo Yakult Swallows players
Toronto Blue Jays players
2015 WBSC Premier12 players